Hiwaga ng Kambat is a 2019 Philippine drama television series starring Edward Barber and Grae Fernandez. The series premiered on ABS-CBN's Yes Weekend! Sunday block from April 21 to August 25, 2019, replacing Wansapanataym.

Synopsis
A twin was born in a partner who was cursed so that their child will turn into bats. The curse came true, as baby Twins were born. One looks normal, but inherited the hot-blooded and impatience traits of a bat, another looks literally a bat, complete with blind eyes and strong sonar and enhanced hearing. The bat-shaped baby was abandoned in a farming town, while keeping the human baby. Many years later, the twins grew differently. Iking being kind to his family, despite being cursed to transform into a bat on night. While Mateo inherited his father's vile attitude, matching his impatience and hot-bloodedness. Their fates and rivalry got intertwined when Iking goes to Mateo's school.

Cast

Main cast
 Edward Barber as Michael E. Baron / Francisco "Iking" Castro
 Grae Fernandez as Mateo E. Baron

Supporting cast
 Maymay Entrata as Sarah Pamintuan
 Chanty as Loraine Maniquis
 Sunshine Cruz as Melissa Enriquez-Baron
 Epi Quizon as Zandro Baron
 Malou de Guzman as Epifania "Panying" Castro
 Johnny Revilla as Jaime Enriquez
 Michael Rivero as Tomas Pamintuan
 Rubi Rubi as Delia Pamintuan
 Antonette Garcia as Oryang
 Manuel Chua as Berting

Guest cast
 JJ Quilantang as young Iking
 Robert “Robbie” Wachtel as young Mateo
 Lawrence Roxas as Dodong

Rerun
The show re-aired on Kapamilya Channel in August 7, 2021, to December 11, 2021, replacing the reruns of Parasite Island and was replaced by Uncoupling.

Reception

See also
 List of programs broadcast by ABS-CBN
 List of ABS-CBN drama series

References

External links
 
 

ABS-CBN drama series
Philippine horror fiction television series
Fantaserye and telefantasya
2019 Philippine television series debuts
2019 Philippine television series endings
Television series by Dreamscape Entertainment Television
Television shows set in the Philippines
Filipino-language television shows